Lake Chad is a historically large, shallow, endorheic lake in Central Africa, which has varied in size over the centuries. According to the Global Resource Information Database of the United Nations Environment Programme, it shrank by as much as 95% from about 1963 to 1998. Lake Chad is economically important, providing water to more than 30 million people living in the four countries surrounding it (Chad, Cameroon, Niger, and Nigeria) on the central part of the Sahel. It is the largest lake in the Chad Basin.

Geography and hydrology
The freshwater lake is located in the Sahelian zone of West-central Africa. It is located in the interior basin which used to be occupied by a much larger ancient body of water sometimes called Mega Chad. The lake is historically ranked as one of the largest lakes in Africa. Its surface area varies by season as well as from year to year. Lake Chad is mainly in the far west of Chad, bordering on northeastern Nigeria.

The Chari River, fed by its tributary the Logone, provides over 90% of the lake's water, with a small amount coming from the Yobe River in Nigeria/Niger. Despite high levels of evaporation, the lake is fresh water. Over half of the lake's area is taken up by its many small islands (including the Bogomerom Archipelago), reedbeds and mud banks, and a belt of swampland across the middle divides the northern and southern halves. The shorelines are largely composed of marshes. The Lake Chad flooded savannas surround the lake, including permanently and seasonally-flooded grasslands, savannas, and woodlands.

Because Lake Chad is very shallow—only  at its deepest—its area is particularly sensitive to small changes in average depth, and consequently it also shows seasonal fluctuations in size. Lake Chad has the Bahr el-Ghazal outlet, but its waters percolate into the Soro and Bodélé depressions. The climate is dry most of the year, with moderate rainfall from June through September.

History
Lake Chad gave its name to the country of Chad. The name Chad is claimed to be derived from the Kanuri word "Sádǝ", said to mean "large expanse of water", however, the Kanuri dictionary by Norbert Cyffer  implies that this may simply be a phonetic derivation of the name Chad since no such word exists in the Kanuri language that explicitly means 'lake' or 'large body of water', as the Kanuri words kùlúwù (lake, river) and njîkúra (sea, ocean) bear no resemblance. 

The lake is the remnant of a former inland sea, paleolake Mega-Chad, which existed during the African humid period. At its largest extent the river Mayo Kébbi represented the outlet of the paleolake Mega-Chad, connecting it to the Niger River and the Atlantic. This lowest point on the basin's rim now stands at about 320 meters above sea level, meaning that even if Lake Chad were to refill to its largest extent it would still be at the most only about 50 meters deep. The presence of African manatees in the inflows of Lake Chad is an evidence of the overflow history, since the manatee is otherwise only in rivers connected to the Atlantic Ocean (i.e. it is not possible that it evolved separately in an enclosed Chad Basin). The grand scale of the Mayo Kébbi river course is also evidence of earlier overflow from Mega-Chad; the upstream catchment of today is far too small to have dug such a large channel.

Romans reached the lake in the first century of their empire. During the time of Augustus Lake Chad was still a huge lake and two Roman expeditions were performed in order to reach it: Septimius Flaccus and Julius Maternus reached the "lake of hippopotamus (as the lake was called by Claudius Ptolemaeus). They moved from coastal Tripolitania and passed near the Tibesti mountains. Both expeditions passed through the territory of the Garamantes, and were able to leave a small garrison on the "lake of hippopotamus and rhinoceros" after three months of travel in desert lands.

Lake Chad was first surveyed from shore by Europeans in 1823, and it was considered to be one of the largest lakes in the world then. In 1851, a party including the German explorer Heinrich Barth carried a boat overland from Tripoli across the Sahara Desert by camel and made the first European waterborne survey. British expedition leader James Richardson died just days before reaching the lake.

In Winston Churchill's book The River War: An Account of the Reconquest of the Sudan, published in 1899, he specifically mentions the shrinking of Lake Chad. He writes:

Altogether France has enough to occupy her in Central Africa for some time to come: and even when the long task is finished, the conquered regions are not likely to be of great value. They include the desert of the Great Sahara and wide expanses of equally profitless scrub or marsh. Only one important river, the Shari, flows through them, and never reaches the sea: and even Lake Chad, into which the Shari flows, appears to be leaking through some subterranean exit, and is rapidly changing from a lake into an immense swamp.

An increased demand on the lake's water from the local population has likely accelerated its shrinkage over the past 40 years.

The size of Lake Chad greatly varies seasonally with the flooding of the wetlands areas.

A 2001 study published in the Journal of Geophysical Research blamed the lake's retreat largely on overgrazing in the area surrounding the lake, causing desertification and a decline in vegetation. The United Nations Environment Programme and the Lake Chad Basin Commission concur that at least half of the lake's decrease is attributable to shifting climate patterns. UNEP blames human water use, such as inefficient damming and irrigation methods, for the rest of the shrinkage. As late as December 2014, Lake Chad was still sufficient in size and volume such that boats could capsize or sink. The European Space Agency has presented data in 2013 showing an actual increase in lake extent of Lake Chad between the years of 1985 to 2011.

Referring to the floodplain as a lake may be misleading, as less than half of Lake Chad is covered by water through an entire year. The remaining sections are considered wetlands.

Flora
The lake is home to more than 44 species of algae.  In particular it is one of the world's major producers of wild spirulina.  The lake also has large areas of swamp and reedbeds. The floodplains on the southern lakeshore are covered in wetland grasses such as Echinochloa pyramidalis, Vetiveria nigritana, Oryza longistaminata, and Hyparrhenia rufa.

Fauna

The entire Lake Chad basin holds 179 fish species, of which more than half are shared with the Niger River Basin, about half are shared with the Nile River Basin, and about a quarter are shared with the Congo River Basin. Lake Chad itself holds 85 fish species. Of the 25 endemics in the basin, only Brycinus dageti is found in the lake itself, and it is perhaps better treated as a dwarf subspecies of Brycinus nurse. This relatively low species richness and virtual lack of endemic fish species contrasts strongly with other large African lakes, such as Victoria, Tanganyika and Malawi.

There are many floating islands in the lake. It is home to a wide variety of wildlife, including elephants, hippopotamus, crocodile (all in decline), and large communities of migrating birds including wintering ducks, ruff (Philomachus pugnax) and other waterfowl and shore birds. There are two near-endemic birds in the region, the river prinia (Prinia fluviatilis) and the rusty lark (Mirafra rufa). The shrinking of the lake is threatening nesting sites of the black-crowned crane (Balearica pavonina pavonina). During the wet season, fish move into the mineral-rich lake to breed and find food. Carnivores such as the Central African cheetah (Acinonyx jubatus soemmeringii), the striped hyena (Hyaena hyaena) and the caracal (Felis caracal) used to inhabit areas surrounding the lake.

Threats and preservation

There is some debate over the mechanisms causing the lake's disappearance. The leading theory, which is most often cited by the UN, is that the unsustainable usage of the lake by both governments and local communities has caused the lake to be over-used, not allowing it to replenish.

A number of other theories exist, including sea surface temperature changes between the hemispheres or in the Indian Ocean leading to oceanic forcing of rainfall patterns in the Sahel region. Others model anthropogenic sulfate emissions in the later 20th century and conclude that these could also be the cause of rainfall patterns shifting farther south, thereby making the region drier and not allowing the lake to replenish. The implementation of new regulations concerning air pollutants may be responsible for the small increase of the lake size in recent years.

The only protected area is the Lake Chad Game Reserve, which covers half of the area next to the lake that belongs to Nigeria. The whole lake has been declared a Ramsar site of international importance.

Speaking at the United Nations 73rd General Assembly, the President of Nigeria urged the international community to assist in combatting the root causes of conflict surrounding the Lake Chad Endorheic basin. Recent violence in the region has been attributed to competition between farmers and herders seeking irrigation for crops and watering of herds respectively.

In September 2020, in order to explore oil and mining opportunities in the region, Chad's tourism and culture minister wrote to UNESCO, the body which awards the world heritage designation, asking to "postpone the process of registering Lake Chad on the world heritage list".

Management

Plans to divert the Ubangi River into Lake Chad were proposed in 1929 by Herman Sörgel in his Atlantropa project and again in the 1960s. The copious amount of water from the Ubangi would revitalize the dying Lake Chad and provide livelihood in fishing and enhanced agriculture to tens of millions of central Africans and Sahelians. Interbasin water transfer schemes were proposed in the 1980s and 1990s by Nigerian engineer J. Umolu (ZCN scheme) and Italian firm Bonifica (the Transaqua canal scheme).

In 1994, the Lake Chad Basin Commission (LCBC) proposed a similar project, and at a March 2008 summit, the heads of state of the LCBC member countries committed to the diversion project. In April 2008, the LCBC advertised a request for proposals for a World Bank-funded feasibility study. Neighboring countries have agreed to commit resources to restoring the lake, notably Nigeria.

The CIMA (Canada) proposed project can be used as an inland waterway, as it uses the same water flow (100 m3/s) as the Moscow Canal.

Local impact

The dwindling of the lake has had devastating impacts on Nigeria. Because of the way it has shrunk dramatically in recent decades, the lake has been labeled an ecological catastrophe by the UN Food and Agriculture Organization. Human population expansion and unsustainable human water extraction from Lake Chad have caused several natural species to be stressed and threatened by declining lake levels. For example, the decline or disappearance of the endangered painted hunting dog has been noted in the Lake Chad area.

The shrinking of the lake has also caused several different conflicts to emerge, as the countries bordering Lake Chad argue over the rights to the remaining areas of water. Along with international conflicts, violence between countries is also increasing among the lake's dwellers. Farmers and herders want the water for their crops and livestock and are constantly diverting the water, while the lake's fishermen want water diversion slowed or halted in order to prevent continuing decline in water levels resulting in further strain on the lake's fish. Furthermore, populations of birds and other animals in the area are threatened, including those that serve as important sources of food for the local human population.

See also 

 Lake Ptolemy, former lake
 Aral Sea, lake that has largely dried up
 Daphnia barbata, water flea found in Lake Chad
 List of drying lakes
 List of lakes
 Neolithic Subpluvial, former African climate period
 The Sudd, an immense marshland in neighboring South Sudan along the Nile and Bahr-el-Ghazal
 Nikolay Gumilev, wrote a poem on Lake Chad

References

Sources

External links

Bibliography on Water Resources and International Law Peace Palace Library
The Encyclopedia of Earth: Lake Chad flooded savanna
Information on, and a map of, Chad's watershed.
Map of the Lake Chad basin at Water Resources eAtlas.
Article on the disappearing lake in The Guardian.

Lakes become deserts: The story of Lake Chad – patriotdirect.org 

 
Endorheic lakes of Africa
Shrunken lakes
Lakes of Chad
Lakes of Niger
Lakes of Nigeria
Lakes of Cameroon
Flooded grasslands and savannas
Ecoregions of Africa
Lake Chad
Border tripoints
Chad–Niger border
Chad–Nigeria border
Niger–Nigeria border
Cameroon–Chad border
Cameroon–Nigeria border
Ramsar sites in Chad
Ramsar sites in Cameroon
Ramsar sites in Niger
Ramsar sites in Nigeria
International lakes of Africa